Kenneth J. Oscar was Acting United States Assistant Secretary of the Army for Acquisition, Logistics, and Technology from 2001 to 2002.

He was educated at Clarkson University (B.A. in Physics) and at American University (M.S. and Ph.D. in Physics).

Oscar then went to work for United Aircraft, before going to work for the United States Army.  He rose through the ranks to become Associate Technical Director for Research and Development at the U.S. Army Troop Support Command and Director of the Combat Engineering Laboratory at the Belvoir Research and Development Center.  He served as project manager for several programs, including countermine equipment, tactical bridging, and unconventional weapons.

During the Gulf War, Oscar was appointed Deputy Commander for Procurement and Readiness for the Tank-automotive Command (TACOM), working alongside General James Monroe in Southwest Asia from August 1990 to June 1991.  He then served as TACOM’s Deputy Commander for Research, Development and Engineering and as Director of the United States Army Tank Automotive Research, Development and Engineering Center.  In 1994, he moved to the United States Army Materiel Command as the Army Materiel Command Principal Deputy for Acquisition.

In June 1995, Oscar moved to the Headquarters of the United States Department of the Army (HQ DA), becoming Deputy Assistant Secretary of the Army for Procurement in the Office of the Assistant Secretary of the Army (Research, Development and Acquisition).  From May 1997 to June 1998, he was Acting Assistant Secretary of the Army (Research, Development and Acquisition).  From June 2000 to January 2001, he was Acting Administrator of the Office of Federal Procurement Policy in the Office of Management and Budget.  He was then Acting Assistant Secretary of the Army (Acquisition, Logistics and Technology) from January 21, 2001 to February 1, 2002.

Oscar left public service in April 2002, becoming Vice President for Strategy at Fluor Corp.

References

 Profile from Army website

United States Army civilians
Year of birth missing (living people)
Living people
Clarkson University alumni
American University alumni
George W. Bush administration personnel